Annala may refer to:

 Annala (surname), Finnish surname
 Annala (district), in Tampere, Finland
 Annala (village), a district in Kauhava, Finland
 Annala Round Barn, in Hurley, Wisconsin, US